Stefan Reck (born 1954, in Lippstadt) is a German television actor. Currently he lives in Berlin.

His acting training stretching among others graduated from the "Hochschule für Musik und darstellende Kunst" in Hamburg. His most famous roles are Alles außer Mord and that of lawyer Bruno Pelzer in Liebling Kreuzberg. In addition to roles in film and television, Stefan Reck was also on the stage in the role of Frédéric Chopin in the Sommer in Nohant. Reck lives in Berlin.

He was awarded the Goldener Löwe in 1998 for Liebling Kreuzberg.

Filmography 
 1983: 
 1985: The Old Fox: Der Leibwächter
 1989: 
 1989: Löwengrube
 1990: Derrick: Beziehung abgebrochen
 1993: Morlock
 1993: 
 1996: 
 1997–1998: Liebling Kreuzberg
 1997: Busenfreunde
 1998: Busenfreunde 2
 1999: The Beast in the Lake
 2000: Verbotenes Verlangen – Ich liebe meinen Schüler
 2000: Stubbe – Von Fall zu Fall: Baby-Deal
 2007–2008: Familie Sonnenfeld, as Thorsten

External links

Drews Agency Munich 

1954 births
Living people
German male television actors
People from Lippstadt